Machine-Gun Kelly is a 1958 film noir directed by Roger Corman, chronicling the criminal activities of the real-life George "Machine Gun" Kelly.  The film was considered low budget, but received good critical reviews.  It was the first lead role for actor Charles Bronson. Corman called it "a major turning point in my career" because it was from this film he began to get serious critical attention.

American International Pictures released the film as a double feature with 1958's The Bonnie Parker Story. In September 1958, Nicholson and Arkoff of AIP said this was their favorite double feature to date.

Plot
George Kelly (Charles Bronson), dubbed "Machine Gun" by his partner in crime Flo Becker (Susan Cabot) because of his obsession with Thompson submachine guns, pulls off a bank robbery and eventually becomes Public Enemy #1.  Discord grows among his inner circle and Kelly, deathly afraid of being jailed or killed, is dominated and ridiculed by the tough-talking Flo.

A botched robbery causes one of their partners, Michael Fandango (Morey Amsterdam), to lose an arm.  Kelly, goaded on by Flo, kidnaps the daughter of a wealthy businessman for ransom. Fandango fingers him to the police, but is killed by one of Kelly's gang as the house is surrounded.

Kelly intends to surrender, if only to receive a more lenient sentence and avoid execution. Flo again questions his nerve, whereupon Kelly slugs her with his fist, knocking her unconscious. Both are taken away to jail.

Cast

Production
Roger Corman says he was attracted to the story of Kelly because of how the gangster meekly surrendered. He hired R. Wright Campbell as screenwriter, who Corman says "wrote a very good script with strong, well-sketched characters" based a great deal on the facts. Corman also stated he hired the screenwriter based on his previous work, especially Five Guns West.

The film was announced in December 1957. It was to replace The Land of Prehistoric Women on Corman's schedule. Dick Miller was originally announced as the star.  In early January, Susan Cabot was announced as the female lead.

Miller dropped out and the film became the first appearance of actor Charles Bronson in a lead role; he would later be acclaimed for roles in Once Upon a Time in the West, The Magnificent Seven and the Death Wish series.

Corman says the film was shot in ten days for $60,000. He says he wanted to make the film because he thought Kelly was an interesting character and liked the title "Machine Gun Kelly".

Susan Cabot said the film was the "most satisfactory" of the six movies she made with Corman, in part because of the "fun thing going on" between her character and Bronson's and the strength of the relationship she had with Bronson.

Reception

Critical response
The Los Angeles Times called it a "sleeper" with "a very good screenplay" in which Bronson makes Kelly "a full, three dimensional human being".

Corman says the film was reasonably successful in the U.S. but very successful in Europe, leading to Corman's work being examined in such journals as Cahiers du Cinéma.

See also
 List of American films of 1958
 List of Hood films

References

Notes

External links
 
 
 
 
Machine Gun Kelly at Letterbox DVD
review by Variety

1958 films
1958 crime films
1950s biographical films
American crime films
American biographical films
1950s English-language films
Biographical films about criminals
American International Pictures films
Films directed by Roger Corman
Films produced by Roger Corman
Films with screenplays by Robert Wright Campbell
Films scored by Gerald Fried
Cultural depictions of Machine Gun Kelly
1950s American films